Melbourne ministry may refer to:

 First Melbourne ministry, the British government led by Lord Melbourne from July to November 1834
 Second Melbourne ministry, the British government led by Lord Melbourne from 1835 to 1841